The Georgia Rugby Union (GRU) is the Local Area Union (LAU) for rugby union teams in the U.S. state of Georgia and other parts of the Southeastern United States. The GRU is part of USA Rugby. It is a non-profit organization and is the primary overseeing body for the promotion of rugby union in the region. The GRU has been in existence since perhaps as early as 1978.

The GRU is divided into four divisions: Senior Men, Senior Women, College Men, and College Women. The union includes clubs from across Georgia.

References

Related links
 Georgia Rugby Union Officials
Atlanta Old White Rugby Football Club 
High Country Rugby Football Club
 Atlanta Renegades RFC
 Savannah Shamrocks – a member club of the GRU
Exiles RFC - a member club of the GRU
 Augusta Rugby Football Club
 All member clubs

Georgia Rugby Union
Rugby union governing bodies in the United States